Central Noble High School is a public high school in the town of Albion, Indiana, United States. It is the high school for the Central Noble Community Schools. Students from Albion Elementary, Wolf Lake Elementary, and Central Noble Middle School are sent to the high school after passing the eighth grade.

Mission statement
The mission statement for CNHS is as follows:

"Central Noble High School strives to educate all students to their fullest potential by developing skills and attitudes for success and the desire for lifelong learning."

Ethnicity
Central Noble High School had an enrollment of 436 students as of 2012. A breakdown of the student's ethnicity is displayed below:
 White: 415 students
 Black: 3 students
 Hispanic: 7 students
 Asian: 3 students
 American Indian: 4 students
 Multiracial: 4 students

Athletics

Central Noble High School sports operate under the Indiana High School Athletic Association (IHSAA), in the Northeast Corner Conference (NECC). Students have many opportunities to play sports at the high school. To be eligible to play a sport at CNHS a student may have at most one failing grade. A grade check to determine eligibility is performed at the start of the semester preceding the sport the student wishes to play. The sports at CNHS are listed below:

Fall:
 Football (Boys)
 Cross Country (Co-ed)
 Tennis (Boys)
 Volley Ball (Girls)
 Soccer (Boys)
 Soccer (Girls) 
 Cheerleading (Girls)

Winter:
 Basketball (Boys)
 Basketball (Girls) 2018 IHSAA 2A State Champions
 Wrestling (Co-ed)
 Cheerleading (Girls)

Spring:
 Track and Field (Boys)
 Track and Field (Girls)
 Tennis (Girls)
 Golf (Boys)
 Baseball (Boys)
 Softball (Girls)

Alumni 
David Ober (2005) - Former member of the Indiana House of Representatives from the 82nd district, Current Member of the Indiana Utility Regulatory Commission.

Connor Essegian- Basketball Player for the Wisconsin Badgers Men’s Basketball Team. Who broke the freshmen 3pt record with Wisconsin with currently 61 3pt shots made.

See also
 List of high schools in Indiana

References

External links
 Central Noble Schools
 Central Noble High School

Public high schools in Indiana
Schools in Noble County, Indiana